Draženko Bogdan (born 4 November 1970) is a Bosnian professional football manager and former player. He was most recently an assistant manager of the Bosnia and Herzegovina U21 national team.

References

1970 births
Living people
Sportspeople from Mostar
Croats of Bosnia and Herzegovina
Bosnia and Herzegovina footballers
HŠK Zrinjski Mostar players
Association football defenders
Bosnia and Herzegovina football managers
Premier League of Bosnia and Herzegovina managers
HŠK Zrinjski managers